is a town located in Kikuchi District, Kumamoto Prefecture, Japan.

As of October 2016, the town has an estimated population of 41,411 and a density of 1,100 persons per km2. The total area is 37.57 km2.

Kikuyō borders the city of Kumamoto on the north-east side and is centered on Highway 57 and the Aso-bound train line. The town is growing, due to the presence of a Tokyo Electric plant and the current construction of a new Fujifilm plant on highway 57.

Kikuyō is known for its Kikuyō carrots.

Kikuyō has two junior high schools, six elementary schools, and eight public preschools. Most senior high school students attend public schools in the cities of Kumamoto or Ōzu.

Notable people from Kikuyō
Masanobu Komaki, football player
Takashi Sawada, football player
Daisuke Yano, football player

References

External links

Kikuyō official website 

Towns in Kumamoto Prefecture